Amory is both an English given name – derived from the Old German name Amalric via the French form Amaury – and a surname derived from it.

Given name 
 Slats Gill, real name Amory Gill (1901–1966), American sports coach
 Amory Hansen (1887–1961), Danish tennis player
 Amory Nelson Hardy (1835–1911), American photographer
 Amory Holbrook (1820–1856), American lawyer and politician
 Amory Houghton (1899–1981), American diplomat
 Amo Houghton (1926–2020), American diplomat; son of Amory Houghton
 Amory Lovins (born 1947), American physicist
 Amory Kane, otherwise Jack Kane (born 1946), American musician
 Amory Dwight Mayo (1823–1907), American Unitarian clergyman

Surname 
 Alan Amory, South African academic
 Anthony Amory (born 1963), Bermudan cricketer
 Cleveland Amory (1917–1998), American author
 Estelle Mendell Amory (1845–?), American author, educator
 Katharine Greene Amory (1731–1777), Boston diarist
 Patrick Amory (born 1965), American recorded music historian
 Peter Amory (born 1962), English actor
 Samuel Amory (1784–1857), English lawyer
 Thomas Amory (disambiguation)
 Vance Amory (born 1949), Prime Minister of Nevis

See also 
 Amory Blaine, a fictional character
 Amory Lorch, a fictional character from the A Song of Ice and Fire books.
 Heathcoat-Amory
 Viscount Amory

References 

English-language masculine given names
English-language surnames